is a Sapporo Municipal Subway station in Chūō-ku, Sapporo, Hokkaido, Japan. The station is numbered T06.

The station takes its name from the Maruyama Park, located 300 m west of the station.

Platforms

Surrounding area
 Maruyama Park
 Sapporo Maruyama Zoo
 Maruyama Bus Terminal
 Hokkaidō Shrine
 Maruyama Baseball Stadium
 Maruyama Athletics Stadium
 Post Office Maruyama branch

External links

 Sapporo Subway Stations

 

Railway stations in Japan opened in 1976
Railway stations in Sapporo
Sapporo Municipal Subway
Chūō-ku, Sapporo